Plectroniella is a monotypic genus of flowering plants in the family Rubiaceae. It was described by Walter Robyns in 1928. The genus contains only one species, i.e. Plectroniella armata, which is found in southern Mozambique and northeastern South Africa. The species is characterized by the presence of large spines and is morphologically  similar to Canthium. In 2004, a molecular phylogenetic study showed that Plectroniella armata is related to Canthium ciliatum and the transfer of the genus to Canthium was suggested.

References

External links 
 World Checklist of Rubiaceae

Monotypic Rubiaceae genera
Vanguerieae